John Joseph Cassin (August 15, 1840 – January 1, 1901) was an American politician from New York.

Life 
Cassin was born on August 15, 1840 in Greenbush, New York, near Rensselaer. His parents were Irish. He worked as a hotel keeper and an agent. He served as town supervisor for Greenbush for two terms and Acting Superintendent of the Poor of Rensselaer County for nine years.

In 1891, Cassin was elected to the New York State Assembly as a Democrat, representing the Rensselaer County 3rd District. He served in the Assembly in 1892, 1893, and 1894.

In 1900, Cassin's son drowned while skating. He moved to Albany shortly afterwards. He never recovered from his son's death, and he died in his Albany home on January 1, 1901. He was buried in St. Agnes Cemetery.

References

External links 
The Political Graveyard

1840 births
1901 deaths
People from Rensselaer County, New York
Town supervisors in New York (state)
Democratic Party members of the New York State Assembly
19th-century American politicians
Burials at St. Agnes Cemetery
American people of Irish descent